Peter Heatherington (born 18 February 1949) is an English retired rally driver from Morpeth. He first appeared in the British Rally Championship when he was 49.

He has twice been married, first in 1972, and again in 1996, before starting his rally career as a hobby.

He was co-driven by his son, Chris Heatherington, who studied at Durham University. Peter made his WRC debut at Rally GB in 2000 as a privateer entry and was 53rd. He referred to his start as a "once in a lifetime" event for him and true to his word, it was to be his only start in Rally GB, but at least they made it to the finish. Peter was an ex-accountant before his rallying career blossomed.

References

External links
 WRC Results (eWRC)

English rally drivers
1949 births
World Rally Championship drivers
Living people